Major Sir Marc Noble (1927– January 1991) served as the Commonwealth Commissioner of the Scout Association, as well as the Chairman of the World Budget and Treasury Committee of the World Organization of the Scout Movement.

In 1988, Noble was awarded the 197th Bronze Wolf, the only distinction of the World Organization of the Scout Movement, awarded by the World Scout Committee for exceptional services to world Scouting. He was also a recipient of the Silver World Award.

Noble was the great grandson of the engineer Isambard Kingdom Brunel.

He was awarded a CBE in the New Years Honours list 1991, but died of cancer a week later.

References

External links

Recipients of the Bronze Wolf Award
1927 births
1991 deaths
The Scout Association